HMS Dragon was a Doterel-class sloop of the Royal Navy, built at Devonport Dockyard and launched on 30 May 1878. She served in the East Indies, including the Anglo-Egyptian War of 1882, and the suppression of slavery.  She was sold for breaking in 1892.

Design
The Doterel class was designed by Nathaniel Barnaby as a development of William Henry White's 1874 .  The graceful clipper bow of the Ospreys was replaced by a vertical stem and the engines were more powerful. The hull was of composite construction, with wooden planks over an iron frame.

Propulsion

Armament
Ships of the class were armed with two 7-inch (90 cwt) muzzle-loading rifled guns on pivoting mounts, and four 64-pounder muzzle-loading rifled guns (two on pivoting mounts, and two broadside). Four machine guns and one light gun completed the weaponry.

Sail plan
All the ships of the class were provided with a barque rig, that is, square-rigged foremast and mainmast, and fore-and-aft sails only on the mizzen mast.

Crew
Dragon would have had a normal complement of 140–150 men.

Construction
Dragon was ordered from Devonport Dockyard and laid down on 26 April 1877.  She was launched on 30 May 1878 and was commissioned on 19 February 1879.

Service
Having commissioned she made passage to the East Indies Station.  She took part in the Egyptian War in 1882 under the command of Edward Grey Hulton, landing a naval brigade at Suez. The naval brigade occupied the town, the Egyptian troops fled, and the burning of the town, which had been feared, was averted.  In 1884 and 1885 she worked to suppress slavery in the Persian Gulf and east coast of Africa. By 1890 she had returned to Devonport.

Fate
She was sold for breaking on 24 September 1892.

References

 

1878 ships
Doterel-class sloops
Victorian-era sloops of the United Kingdom
Ships built in Plymouth, Devon